Dragan Petričević (born 31 January 1969), is a Bosnian-Romanian professional basketball coach. He currently serves as a head coach for SCM Timișoara of the Liga Națională.

Coaching career
Petričević was a head coach for U Invest Cluj-Napoca, Politehnica Moldrom Iași, West Petrom Arad, Asesoft Ploiești, Farul Constanța, SCM Timișoara of the Romanian Men's League. Petričević coached Étoile Sportive du Sahel and Club Africain of Tunisian Division I Basketball League and MIA Academy of the Georgian Superliga.

Women's basketball 
Also, coached CSM Târgoviște and CS Universitatea Cluj-Napoca of the Romanian Women's League.

International career 
Petričević had two stints with Romania men's national team, from 1996 to 1998 and in 2000. He also coached Romania national under-19 basketball team in 2007.
In 2017, he was named a head coach for the Romania women's national basketball team.

Career achievements and awards 
 FIBA Africa Clubs Champions Cup winner: 1 (with Étoile Sportive du Sahel: 2011)
 Romanian Men's League champion: 4 (with U Invest Cluj-Napoca: 1995–96; with West Petrom Arad: 2000–01, 2001–02; with Asesoft Ploiești: 2003–04)
 Tunisian League champion: 1 (with Étoile Sportive du Sahel: 2011–12)
 Tunisian Cup winner: 1 (with Étoile Sportive du Sahel: 2011–12)
 Romanian Women's League champion: 1 (with CSM Târgoviște: 2002–03)
 Romanian Men's Cup winner: 3 (with Asesoft Ploiești: 2003–04; with SCM Timișoara/Elba Timișoara: 2009–10, 2014–15)

Individual
 Romanian Coach of the Year: 2008
 The Best coach of the FIBA Africa Clubs Champions Cup: 2011

References

External links 
 Profile at eurobasket.com
 Profile at promotex.org

1969 births
Living people
Alexandria Sporting Club coaches
Bosnia and Herzegovina basketball coaches
Bosnia and Herzegovina expatriate basketball people in Romania
Club Africain basketball coaches
Naturalised citizens of Romania
Romanian basketball coaches
Romanian people of Serbian descent
Sportspeople from Sarajevo
Serbs of Bosnia and Herzegovina